The Saw Doctors are an Irish rock band. Formed in 1986 in Tuam, County Galway, they have achieved eighteen Top 30 singles in the Republic of Ireland including three number ones. Their first number one, "I Useta Lover," topped the Irish charts for nine consecutive weeks in 1990 and holds the record for the country's all-time biggest-selling single. On 15 February 2008, they received a Lifetime Achievement Award at the Meteor Ireland Music Awards.

Career

Origins and line-up
The Saw Doctors were formed in 1986 by Leo Moran (formerly a member of defunct Tuam reggae band, Too Much for the White Man), Davy Carton (formerly a songwriter and guitarist with short-lived Tuam punk band Blaze X), and local vocalist Mary O'Connor. The trio got their start playing small gigs in local venues such as Tuam's Imperial Hotel. O'Connor left the group the following year to immigrate to London. Carton and Moran added other musicians and carried on with the band.

Moran and Carton have been the only constant presences in the Saw Doctors' ever-shifting line-up. Past members have included musical artist, producer and co producer of the band's debut album, John "Turps" Burke '87 to '93; bass player Pearse Doherty; keyboard and accordion player Tony Lambert; keyboard player and guitarist Derek Murray; and drummers Padraig Stevens, John Donnelly, Jimi Higgins, and Fran Breen. The fluidity of the band's line-up in part accounts for the variety of musical influences, including pop, punk, rock and roll, and traditional Irish, that make up the band's signature sound.

As of 2016, the Saw Doctors are Leo Moran (vocals, guitar), Davy Carton (vocals, guitar), Kieran Duddy (keyboards), Anthony Thistlethwaite (saxophone), Will Merrigan (bass) and Rickie O'Neill (drums).

Rise to fame
The Saw Doctors rose to national attention during 1987 and 1988 as they toured in support of popular Irish bands such as the Hothouse Flowers and The Stunning. They also proved to be a success when they played at the 1988 Galway Arts Festival. In the spring of 1988, when The Saw Doctors were playing a six-week residency at the Quays Bar in Galway, their live show attracted the attention of The Waterboys, who were then recording their Fisherman's Blues album in nearby Spiddal. Pub sessions and budding friendships among the two groups would prove fruitful for the Saw Doctors' future and would see eventual crossovers between the two groups. The band's current saxophonist, Anthony Thistlethwaite, and former drummer, Fran Breen, have both been members of The Waterboys.

In the autumn of 1988, The Saw Doctors filmed a rockumentary on a flat-bed truck while driving between Galway and Salthill, a parody of U2's newly released Rattle and Hum film, in which U2 played Bob Dylan's "All Along the Watchtower" from a flat-bed truck in San Francisco, The Saw Doctors' Crackle and Buzz had its world premiere at the Claddagh Palace Cinema in Galway. The Saw Doctors played live from the cinema's balcony, caricaturing the short acoustic set U2 played atop the Savoy Cinema on O'Connell Street when Rattle and Hum premiered there on 27 October 1988. Footage from the tongue-in-cheek stunt was featured on RTÉ's main evening news.

In late 1988 and early 1989, The Saw Doctors accompanied The Waterboys on tours of Ireland and Great Britain. In August 1989, The Waterboys' frontman Mike Scott produced the band's first single, "N17," a song about an Irish emigrant longing to be driving on the N17 national route which connects Galway with Co. Mayo and Co. Sligo, passing through the Saw Doctors' hometown of Tuam. Although "N17" did not chart upon its original release, the band's appearance at the inaugural 1990 Féile music festival in Thurles, County Tipperary, cemented their reputation as a live act. The song became known as the band's anthem.

Following their success at Féile, the band released their second single, "I Useta Lover," a humorously off-colour paean to an ex-girlfriend. The single topped the Irish charts in September 1990 and spent nine weeks at number one, becoming Ireland's all-time best-selling single. A re-released "N17" reached number one in the Irish charts at Christmas 1990, and the following year, the band's debut album If This Is Rock and Roll, I Want My Old Job Back entered the Irish albums chart at number one.

In 1992, the band released their second Album All The Way From Tuam, which included live favourites "Green & Red of Mayo", "Exhilarating Sadness" and "You Got Me on the Run" as well as the singles "Wake Up Sleeping", "Pied Piper", "Never Mind The Strangers", "Me Heart Is Living in the Sixties Still" and their next number one hit, "Hay Wrap". After the release of All The Way From Tuam, the band parted company with Warner Music and formed their own record label, Shamtown Records.

The first release under their new Shamtown label was the "Small Bit of Love" EP which gained them their first Top 30 hit in the UK Singles Chart and an appearance on BBC Television's Top of the Pops.

The band released their third studio album Same Oul' Town in February 1996. It went on to peak at number six in the UK Albums Chart. It included the hit singles "World of Good", "To Win Just Once" and the double A-side "Clare Island" / "Everyday". The band's subsequent work did not reach the same success of Same Oul' Town, and many line-up changes happened over the next few years. However, they had successful British and US tours, and appeared at the Glastonbury Festival and Oxegen.

In October 1998, their fourth album Songs From Sun Street was released, which included tracks that had been part of the live show for the previous few years including "Galway & Mayo", "Tommy K" & "I'll Be on My Way". They also appeared in the 1999 Walter Foote film The Tavern as well as contributing songs to its soundtrack.

The fifth studio album Villains? was released in 2001 and contained the minor hit "This Is Me". Entertainment.ie said in its review "to many music fans they're a novelty act that's long since passed its sell-by date. It would be a shame, however, if their dodgy image obscured the music, since Villains? is by some distance the best album they've ever made."

Pearse Doherty left the band after the touring of Villains? was completed leaving only Carton and Moran as members from the early days. The line-up changed to include Anthony Thistlethwaite on bass guitar. Thistlethwaite had been playing saxophone on and off with the band since the late 1980s, even playing on their first single "N17".

Live in Galway was released on CD and DVD in 2004. Another live album, Live on News Years Day as well as the sixth studio album The Cure followed. Their career was giving a boost when at the 2008 Meteor Irish Music Awards, The Saw Doctors received the Lifetime Achievement Award. The week before the Meteor Awards the band appeared on the Podge & Rodge Show on RTÉ Television. When on the show they covered the Sugababes song "About You Now", and later decided to release the track as a single. In October 2008 "About You Now" reached number one in the Irish chart, some seventeen years since their last chart-topping feat.

They followed this with the release of another live album and DVD, Live at the Melody Tent, recorded in Cape Cod in the summer of 2008. "She Loves Me" charted at number two. In 2009 after six studio albums, Universal Music released To Win Just Once – The Best of The Saw Doctors.  The compilation album featured twenty two of their tracks, and went platinum within weeks of release.

During 2010, the band played a number of music festival appearances, including playing at the 40th anniversary of the Glastonbury Festival. September 2010 saw the release of their seventh album, The Further Adventures of... The Saw Doctors.

In spring 2013, the Saw Doctors announced a break from touring, initially for a year.

In 2016, the band made the announcement that they would be back in the studio, and during the spring and summer of that year, they toured for the first time in over four years. The band toured Ireland, the UK and US and made an appearance on Ireland's The Late Late Show.

Their tour of the UK and Ireland scheduled for the Autumn and Winter of 2016 was put on hold, as Davy Carton was recovering from a throat operation. The dates were rescheduled to take place in the Spring of 2017.

When the Ireland and UK tour finally took place towards the end of 2017, it was a triumphant success. Subsequently, it was announced that Carton and Moran were writing material for a planned new album.

After a 5-year break from touring, in March 2022, The Saw Doctors announced a 4-date UK Tour for November and December 2022. This tour will consist of dates in Glasgow, London, Leeds and Manchester Apollo.

Live shows and recordings
Although the Saw Doctors have released a number of studio albums over their career, their live shows have brought them international renown. In 2004, the band recorded its show before a crowd at the Black Box Theatre, Galway, and released a live audio CD and a concert DVD, both titled Live in Galway.  The DVD also contained a 50-minute documentary, "A Different Kind of World," following the Saw Doctors around their favourite locales in the West of Ireland (including a trip to Clare Island) and showing them on tour in Brooklyn, New York. A follow-up live album, New Year's Day, again featured the band in the Black Box Theatre, this time on New Year's Day 2005. The band donated profits from this album to victims of 2004 Indian Ocean earthquake.

The band performed three songs at Celtic Park, Glasgow on 21 November 2006 before Celtic's UEFA Champions League match with Manchester United.

Other projects
The Saw Doctors' song "She Says" is used as the theme song to the BBC Northern Ireland comedy series Give My Head Peace. Under the name "The Folk Footballers," Leo Moran and former Saw Doctor Padraig Stevens released The First Fifteen, a collection of songs featuring local artists that celebrated the Galway football team in the wake of its success in the 1998 All-Ireland Senior Football Championship. Re-released in 2001, when Galway again won the All-Ireland football championship. Further collaborations brought a self-titled album by another side-project band, The Shambles.  Guinness used the Saw Doctors song "Never Mind the Strangers" in an advertisement campaign for Harp Lager in the US. The Saw Doctors made an appearance in The Tavern and "Same Oul' Town" was featured in the film. The Saw Doctors appeared on the 2007 Killinascully Christmas special.  The band reappeared in 2010 Killinascully Christmas special.

In 1994 the single "Spanish Lady" was released by Dustin the Turkey and went to No.1 in the Irish Singles Chart on 18 November and stayed there for 4 weeks. Proceeds of the single's sale were in aid of the National Council for the Blind of Ireland. It featured Ronnie Drew and The Saw Doctors. Although not mentioned on the cover sleeve The Saw Doctors are clearly identified during the comic number when Dustin sings "Hey Ronnie is that the Saw Doctors? Is it? Who let yous into the studio? Hey eh Leo outta here this is a Dublin Song, meself and Ronnie." The Saw Doctors proceed to sing a rap verse about cooking turkey and to provide backing vocals until the end of the number.

Man United Man sung by Men United was another Saw Doctor inspired Irish chart topper. Written by Leo Moran and Davy Carton the single's proceeds raised money for the RTÉ telethon appeal, People in Need. It reached the peak on 4 May 1996 and remained there for four weeks.

During the Saw Doctors' break from touring in 2013 three members (Moran, Thistlethwaite and O'Neill) formed a band with fellow Galway musicians called The Cabin Collective. Moran and Thistlethwaite also tour and record as a duo, Leo and Anto.

Lottery win
In April 1993, the Saw Doctors' keyboard and accordion player Tony Lambert, who had previously played with Bonnie Tyler and Alex Harvey, won IR£852,000 (2017: approx. €1.7 million) when he won the jackpot in the Irish National Lottery's Lotto game. Lambert, who at the time was living in a converted bus that he had driven from his native Wales to Galway and parked just off the N17 road, had purchased his winning ticket in a local Claregalway shop. After his win, he left the band and settled in County Galway, where he restored an old house and built his own recording studio.

Coincidentally, the Saw Doctors' song "To Win Just Once" was written and recorded shortly before Lambert hit the Lotto jackpot. It is the only song on the Same Oul' Town album featuring him.

He died on 29 April 2018 in Thailand after a long battle with heart disease.

Discography

Albums
 If This Is Rock and Roll, I Want My Old Job Back (1991)
 All the Way from Tuam (1992)
 Same Oul' Town (1996)
 Sing A Powerful Song (compilation) (1997)
 Songs from Sun Street (1998)
 Villains? (2001)
 Play It Again, Sham! [compilation] (2002)
 Live in Galway [live] (2004)
 New Year's Day [live] (2005)
 The Cure (2006)
 That Takes the Biscuit (2007)
 Live at the Melody Tent [live] (2008)
 To Win Just Once / The Best of the Saw Doctors [compilation] (2009)
 The Further Adventures of... The Saw Doctors (2010)
 25:25 [compilation] (2012)

Discontinued releases
 "Friends Demos B-Sides" [contained other artists] (1994)
 "Somewhere Far Away" (1999)
 "Live on New Year's Day" [limited to 1000 copies, then re-released as "New Year's Day"] (2005)

Irish singles chart

UK singles chart

Music samples

References

External links

The Saw Doctors' Official website
Fans Of The Saw Doctors

Irish rock music groups
Music in Galway (city)
Musical groups established in 1987
Musical groups from County Galway